Pennsylvania Route 62 may refer to:
U.S. Route 62 in Pennsylvania
Pennsylvania Route 62 (1920s)